Marshall Thundering Herd, Marshall University's athletic teams
The Thundering Herd (1925 film), a lost 1925 American Western silent film, based on the 1925 Zane Grey novel, The Thundering Herd
The Thundering Herd (1933 film), a sound remake of the previous 
Thundering herd problem, a problem in computing

As nickname
A nickname of the Wall Street firm Merrill Lynch
A nickname of the 8th Armored Division (United States)
A nickname for several versions of Woody Herman's big band
A nickname for the 1920s championship football teams of the University of Southern California

Music
Thundering Herd, a 2016 album by Kyle Gass Band

American high-school sports team name
Other teams using the "Thundering Herd" name include:
A. H. Parker High School in Birmingham, Alabama
Amador High School (Sutter Creek, California)
Carlisle High School (Carlisle, Pennsylvania)
Elk Grove High School (Elk Grove, California)
Woodbury Junior-Senior High School in Woodbury, New Jersey